The Rankine body discovered by Scottish physicist and engineer Macquorn Rankine, is a feature of naval architecture involving the flow of liquid around a body/surface.

In fluid mechanics, a fluid flow pattern formed by combining a uniform stream with a source and a sink of equal strengths, with the line joining the source and sink along the stream direction, conforms to the shape of a Rankine body.

See also 
 Rankine half body

External links
 Derivation of the Rankine body using potential flow. 

Fluid dynamics